Yaminuechelys is an extinct genus of chelid turtle from Argentina and the Dorotea Formation of Chile. The genus first appeared during the Late Cretaceous and became extinct during the Late Paleocene.

Species 
The genus contains the following two species:
 Y. gasperinii  - Late Cretaceous Allen, Anacleto, La Colonia Formations, Argentina
 Y. maior  - Tiupampan Salamanca and Roca Formations, Argentina

References

Further reading 
 

 

Chelidae
Fossil Chelid Turtles
Prehistoric turtle genera
Late Cretaceous turtles
Santonian genus first appearances
Paleocene genus extinctions
Cretaceous–Paleogene boundary
Santonian life
Campanian life
Maastrichtian life
Tiupampan
Late Cretaceous reptiles of South America
Paleocene reptiles of South America
Cretaceous Argentina
Paleogene Argentina
Fossils of Argentina
Allen Formation
Anacleto Formation
Golfo San Jorge Basin
Cretaceous Chile
Fossils of Chile
Fossil taxa described in 2001
Danian genera
Salamanca Formation